Violanta is a 1976 Swiss historical drama film directed by Daniel Schmid and starring Lucia Bosé, Maria Schneider and Lou Castel.

Cast
 Maria Schneider as Laura  
 Lucia Bosé as Donna Violanta  
 Lou Castel as Silver  
 Ingrid Caven as Alma  
 François Simon as Simon  
 Gérard Depardieu as Fortunat  
 Raúl Gimenez as Adrian  
 Luciano Simioni as David  
 Marilu Marini
 Anne-Marie Blanc

References

Bibliography 
 Moliterno, Gino. The A to Z of Italian Cinema. Scarecrow Press, 2009.

External links 
 

1976 films
1970s historical drama films
Swiss historical drama films
1970s French-language films
Films directed by Daniel Schmid
Films set in the 19th century
1976 drama films
French-language Swiss films